Taiwanese singer-songwriter William Wei has held four concert tours. His debut concert, The Fleeing of a Two-Legged Bookcase, was held at Taipei and Taichung in 2010.  The concert was held in support of his first eponymous album.

In 2012, Wei held his second concert, Through My Lenses, in Hong Kong and later Taiwan. In 2015, Wei held his third concert, Free That Girl, at the Taipei Arena of Taiwan. The concert's opening act was a 15-minute Broadway style sing-and-dance item that infused elements of swing jazz and disco dance. Free That Girl was held in Hong Kong on 18 June 2016.

In 2019, Wei announced his fourth concert tour 'At Thirty' which was held in 8 major cities in China. Wei will continue to tour in Singapore and Malaysia in 2020.

Major concerts

The Fleeing of a Two-Legged Bookcase (2010) 

The Fleeing of a Two-Legged Bookcase (兩腳出書的逃亡) was Wei's first major concert. It was held in support of his first eponymous album. Wei performed songs from his debut album as well as three previously unreleased songs: 'Why Life', 'She'll be an Angel' and 'Me, a Pig, and His Girlfriend'. An accompanying live album of the same name was released on 3 June 2011.

Through My Lenses (2012) 
Through My Lenses (印象派) was Wei's second major concert. It was held in support of his second album. The concert was first held in Hong Kong and it was Wei's first major concert abroad. The concert was later held in Taiwan.

Free That Girl (2015-17) 
Free That Girl was Wei's third major concert. It was his first concert held in Taipei Arena. Wei opened the concert with a 15-minute Broadway style sing-and-dance item along with twelve dancers. The concert also featured a three dimensional guitar-shaped stage that was 3 stories tall and cost NT$2 million to build.

At Thirty (2019 - 2020) 
At Thirty was Wei's fourth major concert. The tour is named after his newest single and is a celebration of his 10 years in music, as well as a beginning for a new phase in his artistry. Each tour leg has its own unique setlist composed of his classic songs as well as newer singles.

After Thirty (2020) 

After Thirty (而立之後) was Wei's fifth major concert and the two shows were held at Taipei Music Center. Having previously toured 8 big cities and released a self-composed album, After Thirty is said to be a ‘brand-new start’ for William Wei as he explores the deep sentiments he holds for his past.⁣

Virtual concerts

Other concerts

References

Lists of concert tours